Echo 3 is an American action thriller television series created by Mark Boal. The series, filmed in English and Spanish, stars Michiel Huisman, Luke Evans, and Jessica Ann Collins and is a black ops thriller and tale of international intrigue, set in Colombia, and shot almost entirely on location in 2021. It is based on the Israeli award-winning series When Heroes Fly created by Omri Givon, and inspired by the eponymous novel of Amir Gutfreund.

Echo 3 premiered on Apple TV+ on November 23, 2022.

Plot 
Amber Chesborough is an American scientist in Colombia researching psychedelics to treat addiction. When she is kidnapped by militants, her brother, Bambi, and her husband, Prince, both US Army Delta Force operators, attempt to rescue her. The men have a complicated relationship, after a recent mission left their team leader dead.

Cast 
 Michiel Huisman as  SFC. Eric "Prince" Haas, a US Army Delta Force operator, husband of Amber, Bambi's brother-in-law and teammate.
 Luke Evans as  MSG. Alex "Bambi" Chesborough, a US Army Delta Force operator, brother of Amber, Prince's brother-in-law and teammate.
 Jessica Ann Collins as Amber Chesborough, a scientist researching psychedelics 
 Elizabeth Anweis as Natalie Foster
 Fahim Fazli as Jabar, an Al Qaeda Commander
 James Udom as Mitch
 Maria Del Rosario as Graciela
 Alejandro Furth as Tomas
 Juan Pablo Raba as Ernesto Matiz
 Sofia Buenaventura as Fami
 Javier Rosado as Julian
 Bradley Whitford as Prince's father.
 Martina Gusmán as Violeta Matiz, a prominent political journalist.
 Franka Potente as Hildy, a prison camp member of Amber's in Colombia
 Temuera Morrison as Roy Lennon, ex-New Zealand SAS.

Episodes

Production

Development 
In July 2020, Apple announced that it had given a 10-episode straight-to-series order for Echo 3, to be produced by Apple and Keshet Studios, and adapted by Mark Boal, with Boal and Jason Horwitch executive producing and co-showrunning the series.

Casting 
In May 2021, Luke Evans and Michiel Huisman were cast in the series, with Elizabeth Anweis and Jessica Ann Collins joining in June 2021.

Filming 
Production for Echo 3 began on June 9, 2021, and concluded on February 1, 2022.

Marketing 
The trailer debuted on October 18, 2022.

Reviews of the trailer have Echo 3 looking tensely realistic and politically relevant.

Several reviews of the trailer mention a line from Amber (Collins) who tells a journalist, “You don’t know my family.” 

One review of the trailer said, “The series is created by two-time Academy Award winner Mark Boal, who’s had plenty of experience in penning thriller stories about foreign policy and with complex political implications.”

Reception 
The review aggregator website Rotten Tomatoes reported a 68% approval rating with an average rating of 6.2/10, based on 25 critic reviews. The website's critics consensus reads, "If Echo 3 doesn't meet creator Mark Boal's evident ambitions for multilayered drama, it succeeds as a lean, mean action adventure". On Metacritic, the show has a weighted average score of 67 out of 100 based on 11 critic reviews, indicating "generally favorable reviews".

References

External links 
 

2020s American drama television series
2022 American television series debuts
American action television series
American thriller television series
English-language television shows
Spanish-language television shows
Apple TV+ original programming
American television series based on Israeli television series
Television shows set in South America